Who Framed Roger Rabbit is an action-adventure video game created for the Nintendo Entertainment System by Rare and published by LJN in 1989. The single-player game is loosely based on the film of the same name and had combined elements of graphic adventure computer games with some more traditional action adventure gameplay. A different version of the game was also released for various computer systems in 1988.

Gameplay

The game takes place in Los Angeles in 1947.

The player controls private detective Eddie Valiant, who is always closely followed by Roger Rabbit. The game begins in the city proper, where Valiant and Roger must search buildings to find useful items while avoiding the weasels of Judge Doom's Toon Patrol and other hazards. Benny the Cab can be found or summoned for faster travel on the roads. As the game progresses, the player can travel to both the outskirts of Los Angeles and to Toontown in order to widen the search. Forested areas off the paved roads contain caves which must also be checked for items. In order to complete the game, the player must find all four pieces of Marvin Acme's lost will, then enter a warehouse in Toontown and defeat Doom.

One of the Los Angeles locations that the player can visit is the Ink and Paint Club, where Roger's wife Jessica is performing. She offers hints as to where to find pieces of the will, and a telephone number can be found by searching the tables. When the game was originally released, players could call that number and hear a recording of Jessica giving additional tips on gameplay. The recording is no longer available, and the number has since been reassigned.

See also
 Who Framed Roger Rabbit (1988 video game)
 Who Framed Roger Rabbit (1991 video game)
 Crazy Castle series

References

External links

1989 video games
North America-exclusive video games
Who Framed Roger Rabbit video games
LJN games
Rare (company) games
Nintendo Entertainment System games
Nintendo Entertainment System-only games
Detective video games
Video games about rabbits and hares
Video games set in the 1940s
Video games set in Los Angeles
Video games scored by David Wise
Video games developed in the United Kingdom
Fiction set in 1947